Azam Khan (Pashto: اعظم خان‎; 20 April 1926 – 28 March 2020) was a Pakistani squash player who won the British Open Championships four times between 1959 and 1962.

Early life and family
Azam Khan was born into a Pashtun family at Nawakville, a small village near Peshawar, Pakistan, on 20 April 1926. At first, he became a tennis coach at the officers' club of the Pakistan Air Force. Soon after that, his older brother Hashim Khan who was 11 years older and was almost like a father figure to him, who also would go on to win seven British titles later in his career, asked him to change his career to squash playing from tennis. When Azam Khan switched over to playing squash, he was such a quick learner that he became the second best player behind his famous brother Hashim Khan within six months. Some people observed that both brothers were short in height. Azam Khan was widely considered one of the world's best shot-makers and game strategists.

Both brothers had settled in London by 1956. He surprised many people by adapting so easily from concrete courts in Pakistan to England's wooden court floors. He also showed a lot of respect for his older brother and mentor Hashim Khan and always tried not to outshine him, when playing against him. As Sports Illustrated magazine noted, that it was "foolish for a Khan to try to outfox a Khan." Azam Khan had a reputation for playing with steely determination. During his long career, one day in 1962 when he was playing in long trousers and a sweater, he had an accident and collapsed with a torn tendon. Both this injury and the death of his 14-year-old son within a year slowed him down and he decided to retire from the game in 1962. 

His older brother Hashim Khan and granddaughter Carla Khan were also squash players.

Azam Khan was the second cousin of the two other leading Pakistani players of his time Roshan Khan and Nasrullah Khan, whose sons Rehmat Khan, Torsam Khan and Jahangir Khan are also squash players. He was the uncle of Sharif Khan and Aziz Khan.

Reception
Jonah Barrington, the six times British Open Champion, writes in his book, Murder in Squash Court that in 1967, a fortnight before the start of British Open, his coach Nasrullah Khan took him to his club and requested him for a match/practice session. Wherein, he scored only one point in three games. Totally shaken, he requested him for another session but the next day, too, he could not improve on it and once again scored only one point against Azam. Only three weeks later, he writes that he won the first of his Six British Open titles. And mind you, Azam Khan was then 48 years old and had left professional squash in 1962.

In his article for international Squash Player Magazine Ejaz Choudhry states that "he was a great player in his own right, but for two reasons, respect for his elder brother and the loss of his son coupled with the fear of injury Azam might have been the greatest squash player of all times. Perhaps he was, In a recent book "Trading Secrets" he does admit that the first time he beat his brother was with his permission, in line with the respect of the family elders, ingrained in Pushtoon culture.

Death
Azam Khan died at the age of 93 on 28 March 2020, after being infected by COVID-19 in London, during the COVID-19 pandemic.

Azam Khan's wife had died some years before he did. One of his sons had died in 1963 at age 14 only. Among the survivors are his eight remaining children.

British Open final appearances

Awards and recognition
 Pride of Performance Award by the Government of Pakistan in 1961.

References

External links 
 
 The Incredible Khans of Squash Part II
 The Khan Family, A Squash Dynasty Part II
 Pakistan Squash - The Khan Supremacy Part III
 Azam Khan, Greatest of them all?
 
 

1926 births
2020 deaths
Deaths from the COVID-19 pandemic in England
Khan family (squash)
Pakistani male squash players
Pashtun people
Pakistani emigrants to the United Kingdom
Recipients of the Pride of Performance